The Voice of the Heart is a 1924 German silent drama film directed by Hanns Schwarz and starring Mary Johnson, Fritz Kampers, and Ágnes Esterházy.

The film's sets were designed by the art director Franz Schroedter.

Cast

References

Bibliography

External links

1924 films
Films of the Weimar Republic
Films directed by Hanns Schwarz
German silent feature films
German black-and-white films
German drama films
1924 drama films
Silent drama films
1920s German films
1920s German-language films